Fort Amsterdam usually refers to the 17th century Dutch fort built in what is now New York City.

Fort Amsterdam may also refer to:

 Fort Amsterdam, Ambon, Indonesia
 Fort Amsterdam (Curaçao)
 Fort Amsterdam, Ghana
 Fort Amsterdam (Sint Maarten)